Tautvydas Šležas (born 31 March 1990) is a Lithuanian ex-basketball player, basketball TV analyst & assistant coach for BC Žalgiris-2

Playing career
Born in Kaunas, Lithuania, Šležas started his professional career 2006 with Bremena-KTU Tauragė of the National Basketball League.

Two years later, he signed with Lietuvos rytas Vilnius, as one of the most promising young players in Lithuania, but he rarely stepped on the court for the team, and was loaned for to its junior team Perlas Vilnius.

On 11 September 2011, signed a one-year contract with Juventus Utena. On 7 October 2011, playing in his second game of the season, Šležas suffered an ankle injury, which kept him out of the lineup for four months. After playing with Prienai and Dzūkija Alytus, Šležas left Lithuania in 2014, when he signed with the Fürstenfeld Panthers of the Österreichische Basketball Bundesliga (ÖBL). In 2015 he signed with Cáceres Patrimonio de la Humanidad of LEB Oro. On 25 January 2016, he became the MVP of the round 19 after scoring 21 points and grabbing 18 rebounds in an 81–78 win over Cocinas.com.

Two weeks later, Šležas signed a contract until the end of the 2015–16 season with Dominion Bilbao Basket of Liga ACB. In summer of 2016, he signed a one-year contract with RETAbet.es GBC of LEB Oro.

National team career

Šležas played for the Lithuanian under-16 national team in the 2006 FIBA Europe Under-16 Championship. In 2008, he played for the Lithuanian under-18 national team in the 2008 FIBA Europe Under-18 Championship where they won silver medals, and was part of the team in the 2009 FIBA Under-19 World Championship. In 2010, he played for the Lithuanian under-20 national team in the 2010 FIBA Europe Under-20 Championship.

Coaching career

During the summertime Tautvydas individually works with such a high-profile players like Edgaras Ulanovas, Marius Grigonis, Tomas Dimša, Saulius Kulvietis, Paulius Sorokas, Paulius Murauskas and others.

On 1st of August 2022 officially became an assistant coach for BC Žalgiris-2.

TV career

After the official retirement in 2019, became one of the top live in-game basketball TV analysts & commentators in Lithuania.

On 25th of September 2022 became the analyst of Lietuvos krepšinio lyga.

Personal life

Šležas is fluent in Lithuanian, English and Spanish.

References

1990 births
Living people
Bilbao Basket players
Centers (basketball)
Gipuzkoa Basket players
Liga ACB players
Lithuanian expatriate basketball people in Austria
Lithuanian expatriate basketball people in Estonia
Lithuanian expatriate basketball people in Spain
Lithuanian men's basketball players
Basketball players from Kaunas
Tartu Ülikool/Rock players